Sly or Slye is the surname of:

People:
 Allan Sly (born 1951), sculptor
 Allan Sly (mathematician), probability theorist and MacArthur Fellow
 Darryl Sly (1939–2007), Canadian National Hockey League player
 Damon Slye (born 1962), computer game designer, director and programmer
 Harold Sly (1904–1996), English professional association football player 
 James Calvin Sly (1807–1864), Mormon pioneer, scout, settler and missionary
 Leonard Slye, birth name of Roy Rogers (1911–1998), America singer and actor
 Maud Slye (1879–1954), American pathologist
 Philippe Sly, Canadian singer
 Richard Meares Sly (1849–1929), Australian judge
 Tony Sly (1970–2012), American singer, songwriter and guitarist, best known as the frontman of the punk rock band No Use for a Name
 William Sly (died 1608), Elizabethan actor and colleague of William Shakespeare

Fictional characters:
 Christopher Sly, in Shakespeare's play The Taming of the Shrew